The Otzumer Balje is a gat in the North Sea.

The gat runs in a north-south direction between the eastern end of the North Sea island of Langeoog and the western end of neighbouring Spiekeroog. About five kilometres below the Otzumer Balje there is a salt dome, 1.5 to 3 kilometres thick and 6,000 metres in diameter - containing Zechstein salts. The shipping channel is marked by navigation aids and has a depth of up to 19 metres. On 5 December 1917 the steamer, Heinrich Horn, built in 1900, sank here. Its wreck is still visible at low tide.

References

External links 
 Information at www.wattenschipper.de
 Diagram with Otzumer Balje on page 15 of the linked document (pdf; 4.1 MB)

Wadden Sea
Geography of East Frisia
Shipwrecks
Langeoog
Spiekeroog